Legaran Segget is a pedestrian walkway in Johor Bahru, Johor, Malaysia which is a covered-up river, Segget River. It is an urban renewal project by the Johor Bahru City Council to eliminate the terrible stench previously emitted from the river.

History
The project which was completed in 2005 costs approximately RM 6 million. In November 2018, the Heritage Cornerstone was erected at the walkway to celebrate Johor's diverse cultural legacy.

Architecture
Legaran Segget has several fountains along the walkway.

References

Johor Bahru
Pedestrian infrastructure